Shmuel (Rubashkin) Eyal (November 7, 1922 – March 5, 2008), OBE, was Haganah fighter and later a major general in the Israel Defense Forces. He served as the 8th head of the Manpower Directorate from 1966 to 1970.

Biography 
Eyal was born on November 7, 1922, in Vitebsk in Byelorussian Soviet Socialist Republic. In 1924 he immigrated to Mandatory Palestine. He went to the kindergarten there and to the Haviv public school in Rishon Le-Zion. He graduated from the Hebrew University in Jerusalem with a degree in economics and history.

In 1937 he enlisted to the Haganah where he underwent a course in Kiryat Anavim. In 1940 he joined the Jewish Settlement Police where he served as a constable ("jhaffir"). During his service he graduated from the Juara training base in Ramat Menashe, in northern Israel. By 1946 was promoted to general commander in Rishon Lezion. In 1947 he was promoted to the Ephraim district commander.

During the 1947–1949 Palestine war, he commanded the 52nd battalion the Givati Brigade. Has a commander he participated in the capture of Ashkelon, Nitzanim, and Isdud. Later becoming part of the Fallujah Pocket in the siege of Beersheba.

After the war, Eyal served as the a head manager in the Air Force. He continued his studies at the Hebrew University. In 1958 he was appointed Civilian Defense's Chief Officer, and by 1960 he had become the Brigade commander of the Nahal Brigade. In 1966 he was appointed to head of the Manpower Directorate.

Israel's military attaché in the UK
After completing his term in 1970 he served as Military attaché in the United Kingdom. At the end of his service, Shmuel Eyal was awarded Officer of the Most Excellent Order of the British Empire by the Queen of the United Kingdom, Elizabeth II for his work in advancing the commerce between Israel and Britain. He was discharged from the army with the rank of major general in 1973.

After his release from the IDF 
With the outbreak of the Yom Kippur War, he was re-enlisted and took part in the Israeli delegation to the "101 Kilometer Talks" which led to the Agreement on Disengagement between Israel and Egypt.

After his release from the army, Eyal ran for mayor of Rishon Lezion from the Alignment party. In 1974 he was appointed to CEO of Hamashbir Lazarchan. Between 1975 and 1989 he acted as the general manager. At the same time he also as assistant chief of the Personnel Directorate assisting with Israeli MIAs. He held that role until 1983.

After retiring, Eyal was involved in many volunteering roles, including:

 Member of the Veterans of the Haganah
 National Board Member of the Israel Management Center
 Member of the Public Council for Commemorating Soldiers
 Member of The Society for Preservation of Israel Heritage Sites (SPIHS) 
 Friends of the Rishon Lezion Museum

References 

1922 births
2008 deaths
Haganah members
Israeli generals
Soviet emigrants to Mandatory Palestine
Israeli expatriates in the United Kingdom